Symphony of Love (Italian: Sinfonia d'amore) is a 1954 French-Italian historical melodrama musical film directed by Glauco Pellegrini and starring Claude Laydu, Marina Vlady and Lucia Bosé. It is a biopic portraying the life of the composer Franz Schubert. The French title release title was Unfinished Symphony (French: Symphonie inachevée),

Cast
 Claude Laydu as Franz Schubert  
 Marina Vlady as Caroline Esterhazy
 Lucia Bosé as Teresa Grob  
 Jone Salinas as Colomba Calafatti  
 Paolo Stoppa as Calafatti  
 Gino Bechi as Vogl 
 Silvio Bagolini as Mayrhofer  
 Rosanna Carteri 
 Riccardo Fellini as Kupelweiser  
 Nicola Monti 
 Heinz Moog as Count Esterhazy  
 Edoardo Toniolo as Count Zilhay

References

Bibliography 
 Mitchell, Charles P. The Great Composers Portrayed on Film, 1913 through 2002. McFarland, 2004.

External links 
 

1954 films
1950s historical musical films
French historical musical films
Italian historical musical films
1950s Italian-language films
Films directed by Glauco Pellegrini
Films set in the 1820s
Films set in Vienna
Biographical films about musicians
Films about composers
Films about classical music and musicians
Cultural depictions of Franz Schubert
1950s Italian films
1950s French films